Boston College Eagles ice hockey may refer to:
Boston College Eagles men's ice hockey
Boston College Eagles women's ice hockey